The Other Half is an independent Chinese film. It is the second feature from Chinese director Ying Liang.

Synopsis
A sensitive and ironic portrayal of life in a Chinese industrial town, where a law clerk contends with her clients’ litany of woes, her shady boyfriend's gambling addiction, her estranged father and the threat of toxic pollution.

Xiaofen works as a clerk at a law firm located in a developing city in Southwestern China. Her job is to meet different female clients of the firm and document each case. However, just like the female clients involved in those lawsuits, Xiaofen is also in trouble. She feels anxious and unsafe. Her boyfriend, who was living with her, goes missing, possibly because he was a murderer. And her mother and her women friends lead unsettled lives.

This movie consists of two alternating parts. One part comprises the actual, true stories told by the female clients whom Xiaofen meets in her job. The other part is the narrative about Xiaofen herself and her female friends. The intention of the film's structure is to present a contemporary report on the status of women living in an inland city in China.

Awards
 Woosuk Award at the Jeonju International Film Festival 2007
 Special Jury Award at the Singapore International Film Festival 2007
 The Special Jury Prize Kodak VISION Award at Tokyo Filmex 2006

Film festivals
 New Directors/New Films at The Museum of Modern Art and the Film Society of Lincoln Center
 Mosaïques 2007
 The 31st Hong Kong International Film Festival 第三十一屆香港國際電影節
 The 50th San Francisco International Film Festival

External links
 The Other Half at Reframe Collection
 

2006 films
2000s Mandarin-language films
2006 drama films
Films set in Sichuan
Chinese drama films